Mike Estime is an American actor and comedian. He has made appearances in the films Harbinger Down and Last Holiday (2006) and the sitcom Talk to Me (2000) as well as the hit television series Everybody Hates Chris as Risky, a street entrepreneur, and on the BET comedy show Comic View. More recently, he appeared in a 2021 episode of The Neighborhood, starring Cedric the Entertainer.

On Comic View, he has made jokes referring to the Haitian culture and his Haitian father.

References 

Place of birth missing (living people)
Year of birth missing (living people)
Living people
American male comedians
21st-century American comedians
American male television actors
American people of Haitian descent